The 22nd Golden Globe Awards, honoring the best in film and television for 1964, were held on February 8, 1965.

Winners and nominees

Film

Best Film - Drama
 Becket
 The Chalk Garden
 Dear Heart
 The Night of the Iguana
 Zorba the Greek

Best Film - Comedy or Musical
 My Fair Lady
 Father Goose
 Mary Poppins
 The Unsinkable Molly Brown
 The World of Henry Orient

Best Actor - Drama
 Peter O'Toole – Becket
 Richard Burton – Becket
 Anthony Franciosa – Rio Conchos
 Fredric March – Seven Days in May
 Anthony Quinn – Zorba the Greek

Best Actress - Drama
 Anne Bancroft – The Pumpkin Eater
 Ava Gardner – The Night of the Iguana
 Rita Hayworth – Circus World
 Geraldine Page – Dear Heart
 Jean Seberg – Lilith

Best Actor - Comedy or Musical
 Rex Harrison – My Fair Lady
 Marcello Mastroianni – Marriage Italian Style (Matrimonio all'italiana)
 Peter Sellers – The Pink Panther
 Peter Ustinov – Topkapi
 Dick Van Dyke – Mary Poppins

Best Actress - Comedy or Musical
 Julie Andrews – Mary Poppins
 Audrey Hepburn – My Fair Lady
 Sophia Loren – Marriage Italian Style (Matrimonio all'italiana)
 Melina Mercouri – Topkapi
 Debbie Reynolds – The Unsinkable Molly Brown

Best Supporting Actor
 Edmond O'Brien – Seven Days in May
 Cyril Delevanti – The Night of the Iguana
 Stanley Holloway – My Fair Lady
 Gilbert Roland – Cheyenne Autumn
 Lee Tracy – The Best Man

Best Supporting Actress
 Agnes Moorehead – Hush...Hush, Sweet Charlotte
 Elizabeth Ashley – The Carpetbaggers
 Grayson Hall – The Night of the Iguana
 Lila Kedrova – Zorba the Greek
 Ann Sothern – The Best Man

Best Director
 George Cukor – My Fair Lady
 Michael Cacoyannis – Zorba the Greek
 John Frankenheimer – Seven Days in May
 Peter Glenville – Becket
 John Huston – The Night of the Iguana

Best Music, Original Score
 "The Fall of the Roman Empire" – Dimitri Tiomkin
 "Becket" – Laurence Rosenthal
 "Mary Poppins" – Richard M. and Robert B. Sherman
 "Seven Days in May" – Jerry Goldsmith
 "Zorba the Greek" – Mikis Theodorakis

Best Song
 "Circus World" – Circus World
 "Dear Heart" – Dear Heart
 "From Russia with Love" – From Russia with Love
 "Sunday in New York" – Sunday in New York
 "Where Love Has Gone" – Where Love Has Gone

Television

Best TV Show 

 The Rogues
 12 O'Clock High
 The Munsters
 The Red Skelton Show
 Wendy and Me

Best TV Star - Male 

 Gene Barry – Burke's Law
 Richard Crenna – Slattery's People
 James Franciscus – Mr. Novak
 David Janssen – The Fugitive
 Robert Vaughn – The Man from U.N.C.L.E.

Best TV Star - Female 

 Mary Tyler Moore – The Dick Van Dyke Show
 Dorothy Malone – Peyton Place
 Yvette Mimieux – Dr. Kildare
 Elizabeth Montgomery – Bewitched
 Julie Newmar – My Living Doll

References
IMdb 1965 Golden Globe Awards

22
1964 film awards
1964 television awards
1964 awards in the United States
February 1965 events in the United States